The Conversion of St Paul is a 1527 oil on canvas painting by Parmigianino, now in the Kunsthistorisches Museum in Vienna.

It was seen in the house of Giovanni Andrea, a major figure in Parma, by both Giorgio Vasari (1550) and Lamo (1560). On Andrea's death in 1566 the work left Parma and is known to have been in Madrid in 1608, where it featured in the collection inventory of Pompeo Leoni. It moved to the museum in Vienna in the 18th century and was first exhibited to the public in 1912.

Sources
http://books.google.es/books?id=qCWMbHCa15AC&pg=PA96&lpg=PA96&dq=Parmigianino,+san+Pablo&source=bl&ots=KuS2k_dBrR&sig=_gjqHo01BWn6EGI655DUWwVkhrc&hl=es&ei=iuvDTsGDIMOB8gP01P3ICQ&sa=X&oi=book_result&ct=result&resnum=5&sqi=2&ved=0CEwQ6AEwBA#v=onepage&q=Parmigianino%2C%20san%20Pablo&f=false

Parmigianino
1527 paintings
Horses in art
Paintings by Parmigianino
Paintings in the collection of the Kunsthistorisches Museum